Sonia Molina-Prados (born 14 July 1993) is a Spanish track and field athlete who competes in 100m, 200m and 4x100m relay races.

Career
Molina-Prados moved from Ciudad Real in Castilla–La Mancha to train in Granada with Manola Jiménez in 2019 and she credits this move with an uplift in her performances, even though the move was hampered and disrupted by the COVID-19 pandemic. In 2022, she lowered her personal best times in both the 100m (11.31) and 200m (23.40). The 100m personal best came at the 2022 Spanish national athletics championships in which she would finish runner-up to Jaël Bestué.

Molina-Prados was part of the Spanish 4 x 100m team that finished  fifth at the World Athletics Championships in Eugene, Oregon, breaking the Spanish national record. The team had initially broken the national record running 42.61 in the qualifying heats to qualify for the final. In the final the following day they lowered the national record again, to 42.58 seconds.

Molina-Prados was announced as part of the Spanish 4x100m relay team for the 2022 European Athletics Championships in Munich. She also competed individually in the 100m in Munich but did not progress past the heats running 11.64 seconds.

References

External links

1993 births
Living people
Spanish female sprinters
20th-century Spanish women
21st-century Spanish women